1995 in sports describes the year's events in world sport.

Alpine skiing
 Alpine Skiing World Cup
 Men's overall season champion: Alberto Tomba, Italy
 Women's overall season champion: Vreni Schneider, Switzerland

American football
 Super Bowl XXIX – the San Francisco 49ers (NFC) won 49–26 over the San Diego Chargers (AFC)
Location: Joe Robbie Stadium
Attendance: 74,107
MVP: Steve Young, QB (San Francisco)
 The World League of American Football is resumed after 2 years without play. Frankfurt Galaxy win the World Bowl 26–22 over the Amsterdam Admirals.
 Orange Bowl (1994 season):
 The Nebraska Cornhuskers won 24–17 over the Miami Hurricanes to win the national championship

Association football
 FIFA Women's World Cup – Norway won 2–0 over Germany
 World Club Championship – AFC Ajax defeat Grêmio 0-0 (4-3 in penalty shootout)
 Copa América - Uruguay defeats Brazil after a 1–1 draw (5-3 in penalty shoot).
 UEFA Champions League – AFC Ajax defeat A.C. Milan 1-0
 Campeonato Brasileiro Série A – Botafogo FR defeat Santos FC 3-2 (aggregate score)
 Copa Libertadores da América – Grêmio defeat Atlético Nacional 4-2 (aggregate score)
Blackburn Rovers won the Premier League, denying Manchester United a hat-trick of titles
 December 15 – European football is shaken to its foundations when the European Court of Justice rules that:
 Clubs in the European Union cannot be restricted from signing foreign players who are nationals of EU member states
 Players under contract to clubs in the EU are entitled to a free transfer at the end of their contracts

Australian rules football
 Australian Football League
 The Fremantle Dockers join the league
 Carlton wins the 99th AFL premiership beating Geelong 21.15 (141) to 11.14 (80)
 The Blues become the first team to win 23 games in an AFL season or twenty in a home-and-away season
 Brownlow Medal awarded to Paul Kelly (Sydney Swans)
 South Australian National Football League
 Sturt suffer the ignominy of going winless for a full 22-match season, the only occurrence thereof in a major Australian Rules league.

Baseball
 World Series – Atlanta Braves won 4 games to 2 over the Cleveland Indians. The Series MVP was Tom Glavine, Atlanta
 September 6 -  Cal Ripken Jr. breaks Lou Gehrig's record of playing 2130 consecutive games.
 California Angels lose a 13-game lead over the Seattle Mariners, and lose the division title in a one-game playoff.

Basketball
 NCAA Men's Basketball Championship –
 UCLA wins 89–78 over Arkansas, giving the Bruins their first National College Basketball Championship in 20 years, and 11th overall.	
 NBA Finals
 Houston Rockets win 4 games to 0 over the Orlando Magic
 National Basketball League (Australia) Finals:
 Perth Wildcats defeated the North Melbourne Giants 2–1 in the best-of-three final series.
 A first season of China Professional Basketball Men's League game held on December 10.

Boxing
 March 11 to March 27 – Pan American Games held in Mar del Plata, Argentina.
 May 6 – Oscar De La Hoya scored a second-round TKO in Las Vegas over Rafael Ruelas to retain his World Lightweight Championship.

Canadian football
 For the first time in history, the Grey Cup went to an American-based team.
 Grey Cup – Baltimore Stallions win 37–20 over the Calgary Stampeders
 Vanier Cup – Calgary Dinos win 54–24 over the Western Ontario Mustangs

Cricket
 December 26 in Melbourne – umpire Darrell Hair no balls Sri Lankan spinner Muttiah Muralitharan seven times for throwing in the second Test against Australia.

Croquet
 The All England Association Handicap Championship is held, won by international croquet player Ian Lines.

Cycling
 Giro d'Italia won by Tony Rominger of Switzerland
 Tour de France - Miguel Indurain of Spain
 UCI Road World Championships – Men's road race – Abraham Olano of Spain

Dogsled racing
 Iditarod Trail Sled Dog Race Champion –
 Doug Swingley won with lead dogs: Vic & Elmer

Field hockey
 Men's Champions Trophy: Germany
 Women's Champions Trophy: Australia
 Men's European Nations Cup: Germany
 Women's European Nations Cup: Netherlands

Figure skating
 World Figure Skating Championship –
 Men's champion: Elvis Stojko, Canada
 Ladies' champion: Chen Lu, China
 Pairs' champions: Radka Kovariková / René Novotný, Czech Republic
 Ice dancing champions: Oksana Grishuk / Evgeny Platov, Russia

Floorball 
 Floorball European Championships
 Men's champion: Finland
 Women's champion: Sweden
 European Cup
 Men's champion: Kista IBK
 Women's champion: Sjöstad IF

Gaelic Athletic Association
Camogie
 All-Ireland Camogie Champion: Cork
 National Camogie League: Cork
Gaelic football
 All-Ireland Senior Football Championship – Dublin 1-10 died Tyrone 0-12
 National Football League – Derry 0-12 died Donegal 0-8
Ladies' Gaelic football
 All-Ireland Senior Football Champion: Waterford
 National Football League: Waterford
Hurling
 All-Ireland Senior Hurling Championship – Clare 1-13 died Offaly 2-8
 National Hurling League – Kilkenny 2–14 beat Clare 0–9

Golf
Men's professional
 Masters Tournament - Ben Crenshaw
 U.S. Open - Corey Pavin
 British Open - John Daly
 PGA Championship - Steve Elkington
 PGA Tour money leader - Greg Norman - $1,654,959
 Senior PGA Tour money leader - Jim Colbert - $1,444,386
 Ryder Cup - Europe won 14½ to 13½ over the United States in team golf.
Men's amateur
 British Amateur - Gordon Sherry
 U.S. Amateur - Tiger Woods
 European Amateur - Sergio García
Women's professional
 Nabisco Dinah Shore - Nanci Bowen
 LPGA Championship - Kelly Robbins
 U.S. Women's Open - Annika Sörenstam
 Classique du Maurier - Jenny Lidback
 LPGA Tour money leader - Annika Sörenstam - $666,533

Harness racing
 North America Cup - David's Pass
 United States Pacing Triple Crown races –
 Cane Pace - Mattgrilla Gorilla
 Little Brown Jug - Nick's Fantasy
 Messenger Stakes - David's Pass
 United States Trotting Triple Crown races –
 Hambletonian - Tagliabue
 Yonkers Trot - CR Kay Suzie
 Kentucky Futurity - CR Trackmaster
 Australian Inter Dominion Harness Racing Championship –
 Pacers: Golden Reign
 Trotters: Call Me Now

Horse racing
Steeplechases
 Cheltenham Gold Cup – Master Oats
 Grand National – Royal Athlete
Flat races
 Australia – Melbourne Cup won by Doriemus
 Canada – Queen's Plate won by Regal Discovery
 France – Prix de l'Arc de Triomphe won by Lammtarra
 Ireland – Irish Derby Stakes won by Winged Love
 Japan – Japan Cup won by Lando
 English Triple Crown races:
 2,000 Guineas Stakes – Pennekamp
 The Derby – Lammtarra
 St. Leger Stakes – Classic Cliche
 United States Triple Crown races:
 Kentucky Derby – Thunder Gulch
 Preakness Stakes – Timber Country
 Belmont Stakes – Thunder Gulch
 Breeders' Cup World Thoroughbred Championships:
 Breeders' Cup Classic – Cigar
 Breeders' Cup Distaff – Inside Information
 Breeders' Cup Juvenile – Unbridled's Song
 Breeders' Cup Juvenile Fillies – My Flag
 Breeders' Cup Mile – Ridgewood Pearl
 Breeders' Cup Sprint – Desert Stormer
 Breeders' Cup Turf – Northern Spur

Ice hockey
 Art Ross Trophy as the NHL's leading scorer during the regular season: Jaromir Jagr, Pittsburgh Penguins
 Hart Memorial Trophy – for the NHL's Most Valuable Player: Eric Lindros, Philadelphia Flyers
 Stanley Cup – New Jersey Devils win 4 games to 0 over the Detroit Red Wings
 World Hockey Championship
 Men's champion: Finland defeated Sweden
 Junior Men's champion: Canada defeated Russia

Lacrosse
 Major Indoor Lacrosse League Championship: The Philadelphia Wings win 15–14 over the Rochester Knighthawks after overtime.
 Mann Cup for the Canadian box lacrosse championship: Six Nations Chiefs of Major Series Lacrosse
 Inaugural European Lacrosse Championships – England defeats Czech Republic

Mixed martial arts
The following is a list of major noteworthy MMA events during 1995 in chronological order.

Before 1997, the Ultimate Fighting Championship (UFC) was considered the only major MMA organization in the world and featured much fewer rules then are used in modern MMA.

|-
|align=center style="border-style: none none solid solid; background: #e3e3e3"|Date
|align=center style="border-style: none none solid solid; background: #e3e3e3"|Event
|align=center style="border-style: none none solid solid; background: #e3e3e3"|Alternate Name/s
|align=center style="border-style: none none solid solid; background: #e3e3e3"|Location
|align=center style="border-style: none none solid solid; background: #e3e3e3"|Attendance
|align=center style="border-style: none none solid solid; background: #e3e3e3"|PPV Buyrate
|align=center style="border-style: none none solid solid; background: #e3e3e3"|Notes
|-align=center
|April 7
|UFC 5: The Return of the Beast
|
| Charlotte, North Carolina, US
|6,000
|260,000
|
|-align=center
|July 14
|UFC 6: Clash of the Titans
|
| Casper, Wyoming, US
|2,700
|240,000
|
|-align=center
|September 8
|UFC 7: The Brawl in Buffalo
|
|  Buffalo, New York, US
|9,000
|190,000
|
|-align=center
|December 16
|The Ultimate Ultimate
|Ultimate Ultimate 1995  UFC 7.5
|  Denver, Colorado, US
|2,800
|
|
|-align=center

Motorsport

Radiosport
 First IARU Region III Amateur Radio Direction Finding Championships held in Japan.
 First High Speed Telegraphy World Championship held in Siófok, Hungary.

Rugby league
Australian international representative forward Ian Roberts became the first high-profile Australian sports person and first rugby footballer in the world to come out to the public as gay.
 March 5 – Carcassonne, France: last match of the 1995 European Championship is played with Wales finishing on top of the table.
 March 10 – Auckland, New Zealand: newly formed Auckland Warriors club play their first match: a 25–22 loss to the Brisbane Broncos at Ericsson Stadium before 29,220.
 April 29 – London, England: 1994-95 Challenge Cup tournament culminates in Wigan's 30–10 win over Leeds in the final at Wembley Stadium before 78,550.
 May 31 – Melbourne, Australia: 1995 State of Origin is wrapped up by Queensland in game two of the three-match series against New South Wales at the Melbourne Cricket Ground before 52,994.
 September 24 – Sydney, Australia: 1995 ARL season culminates in the Sydney Bulldogs' 17–4 win over the Manly-Warringah Sea Eagles in the grand final at the Sydney Football Stadium before 41,127.
 October 24 – Bury, England: 1995 Emerging Nations Tournament culminates in the Cook Islands' 22–6 win over Ireland in the final at Gigg Lane before 4,147.
 October 28 – London, England: 1995 World Cup culminates in Australia's 16–8 win over England in the final at Wembley Stadium before 66,540.

Rugby union
 101st Five Nations Championship series is won by England who complete the Grand Slam
 Rugby World Cup is won by hosts South Africa 15–12 over New Zealand in the final with an extra-time drop goal by Joel Stransky
 26 August – International Rugby Football Board lifts the century-old ban on professionalism

Snooker
 World Snooker Championship – Stephen Hendry beats Nigel Bond 18-9
 World rankings – Stephen Hendry remains world number one for 1995/96

Swimming
 February 11 – Danyon Loader swims world record in the Men's 400m Freestyle, while Mark Foster betters the world record in the Men's 50m Butterfly and Sandra Völker swims a European record in the Women's 50m Backstroke.
 February 18 – Australia's Angela Kennedy breaks the world record in the Women's 100m Butterfly (short court): 58.77
 XII Pan American Games, held in Mar del Plata, Argentina (March 12 – 18)
 22nd European LC Championships, held in Vienna, Austria (August 22 – 27)
 Germany wins the most medals (28), Russia the most gold medals (14)
 II. World Short Course Championships, held in Rio de Janeiro, Brazil (November 30 – December 3)
 December 2 – China's Liu Limin breaks the world record in the Women's 100m Butterfly (short course): 58:68
 December 3 – Australia wins the most medals (26), and the most gold medals (12)

Taekwondo
 World Championships held in Manila, Philippines

Tennis
 Grand Slam in tennis men's results:
 Australian Open – Andre Agassi
 French Open – Thomas Muster
 Wimbledon championships – Pete Sampras
 U.S. Open – Pete Sampras
 Grand Slam in tennis women's results:
 Australian Open – Mary Pierce
 French Open – Steffi Graf
 Wimbledon championships – Steffi Graf
 U.S. Open – Steffi Graf
 Davis Cup – The USA wins 3–2 over Russia.
 Fed Cup – Spain wins 3–2 over the USA in the first  Fed Cup to bear that name, and the first to employ a Davis Cup-style format.

Volleyball
 Men's World Cup: Italy
 Men's European Championship: Italy
 Women's World Cup: Cuba
 Women's European Championship: Netherlands

Water polo
 Men's World Cup: Hungary
 Men's European Championship: Italy
 Women's European Championship: Italy

Yacht racing
 New Zealand wins its first America's Cup as Black Magic, of the Royal New Zealand Yacht Squadron, beats defender Young America, from the San Diego Yacht Club, 5 races to 0

Multi-sport events
 Twelfth Pan American Games held in Mar del Plata, Argentina
 Sixth All-Africa Games held in Harare, Zimbabwe
 18th Summer Universiade held in Fukuoka, Japan
 17th Winter Universiade held in Jaca, Spain
 18th SEA Games held in Chiang Mai, Thailand

Awards
 Associated Press Male Athlete of the Year – Cal Ripken Jr., Major League Baseball
 Associated Press Female Athlete of the Year – Rebecca Lobo, College basketball

References

 
Sports by year